Janet Rosenberg IFLA, FCSLA, FASLA, is a Canadian landscape architect based in Toronto, Ontario, Canada and the founding principal of Janet Rosenberg & Studio.
       
Notable landscape projects include 30 Adelaide Street East (Toronto, 2002), Barrel Warehouse Park (Waterloo, 2001), Town Hall Square (Toronto, 2005), HTO Park (Toronto, 2007), Guelph Civic Centre Market Square (Guelph, 2012), Jamie Bell Adventure Playground, High Park (Toronto, 2012), Fort York’s Visitor Centre (Toronto, 2014), Mirvish Village/Honest Ed’s (Toronto, 2015–), David Braley & Nancy Gordon Rock Garden at Royal Botanical Gardens (Burlington/Hamilton, 2016), Pioneer Village and Finch West TTC stations, Alexandra Park Community Revitalization (Toronto, 2017–), Kìwekì Point (formerly Nepean Point) (Ottawa, 2017–), and The Royal Hotel (Picton, Prince Edward County, Ontario, 2022). Rosenberg, together with Ghanaian-British architect David Adjaye and Israeli designer and artist Ron Arad, was one of the six design teams shortlisted for the Canadian Holocaust Monument international design competition in 2014.

Rosenberg was awarded the 1992 Governor General of Canada Confederation Medal, the 2003 OALA’s Pinnacle Award for Landscape Architectural Excellence, and the 2008 Urban Leadership Award from the Canadian Urban Institute. Rosenberg is a Fellow of the Canadian Society of Landscape Architects and the American Society of Landscape Architects.

References 

Canadian landscape architects

Year of birth missing (living people)
Living people